Xenon is a 1980 pinball machine designed by Greg Kmiec and released by Bally. The game was not only the first talking pinball table by Bally, but also the first with a female voice.

Description
The voice for the female robot theme was provided by Suzanne Ciani who also composed the music of the game. The seductive voice is for example saying "Try Xeeeeenon" in attraction mode or responds to bumper hits with some "Oooh" and "Aaah" moaning sound effects.

Xenon consists of dominant blue artwork e.g. blue bumper caps, plastic posts and bluish light that gives the game a futuristic xenon theme.

The tube shot is the most prominent playfield feature and transports the ball from the upper-right side of the playfield to the middle-left side of the playfield. It consists of a clear acrylic tube with a string of small lights.

An episode of Omni: The New Frontier has a segment that talks about the creation of the game's audio.

Digital version
Xenon was among twelve titles included in the 2006 digital arcade game UltraPin by UltraCade Technologies. It was chosen in a poll for inclusion in FarSight Studios'  2012 release The Pinball Arcade, and was available for purchase on several platforms until the developer's license to include Williams and Bally tables expired in July 2018.

See also
 The Machine: Bride of Pin•Bot

References

External links
 IPDB listing for Xenon
 Xenon by Suzanne Ciani: a complete collection of Suzanne Ciani’s pioneering musical effects for Xenon

1980 pinball machines
Bally pinball machines